Raymond A. "Red" Louthen (October 4, 1925 – December 3, 2004) was an American football and baseball player, coach, and college athletics administrator.  He served as the head football coach at Ball State University from 1962 to 1967, compiling a record of 37–13–3.  Louthen was also the head baseball coach at Ball State from 1959 to 1970, tallying a mark of 158–127–1.

Coaching career

College baseball
Louthen was the head baseball coach at Ball State from 1959 to 1970; he was a 3-time Indiana Collegiate Conference Coach of the Year (1960, 1961, 1962.)  He coached six ICC MVPs (Dean Campbell, Mike Readnour, Homer Jackson, Frank Houk, Ed Sherry and Jim Roudebush) and 19 All-ICC players.   Two of his players reached the major leagues; Merv Rettenmund and Steve Hargan.

Head coaching record

College football

References

External links
 
 Photographs of Ray Louthen from the Ball State University Digital Media Repository

1925 births
2004 deaths
Baseball pitchers
Augusta Tigers players
Ball State Cardinals athletic directors
Ball State Cardinals baseball coaches
Ball State Cardinals football coaches
Beaumont Exporters players
Kansas City Blues (baseball) players
Michigan Wolverines baseball players
Quincy Gems players
Sioux City Soos players
Western Michigan Broncos football players
High school baseball coaches in the United States
High school football coaches in Michigan
Baseball players from Columbus, Ohio
Players of American football from Columbus, Ohio
People from Bluefield, Virginia